The Fort Mohave Indian Reservation is an Indian reservation along the Colorado River, currently encompassing  in Arizona,  in California, and  in Nevada. The reservation is home to approximately 1,100 members of the federally recognized Fort Mojave Indian Tribe of Arizona, California, and Nevada, a federally recognized tribe of Mohave people.

Native Americans occupy less than 50 percent of the Mojave reservation. The Mohave people have leased much of their land to cotton, corn, and soybean farming companies, which employ a large population of resident European-Americans and Mexican Americans.

The site of the former Fort Mohave and the eastern terminus of the Mojave Road are situated within the Fort Mojave Indian Reservation.

History
These lands were occupied for thousands of years by succeeding cultures of Indigenous peoples. The property covers areas along the Colorado River of the three adjacent states of Arizona, California, and Nevada. It also is sporadically traversed by the Mojave River in California.

The Fort Mohave Indian Reservation was established in 1890, and comprised the land of the former camp Mojave military reservation, thereby transferring it from the War Department to the Office of Indian Affairs. For decades until the early 1930s, it operated an Indian boarding school for Native American students from the Mohave and other tribes, as part of efforts to assimilate youth to the mainstream culture. They were forced to speak English and practice Christianity while at the school. The property was transferred to the reservation in 1935. It has allowed the buildings to deteriorate, as they were symbolic of a painful period in relations with the US.

Economy
The Mojave have leased considerable amounts of reservation land to agricultural companies for cultivation of commodity crops: soybeans, corn, and alfalfa. Many Caucasian and Mexican American workers live here, with less than 50% of the reservation occupied by Mohave and other Native Americans.

From 1995 the tribe operates the Avi Resort & Casino in Nevada. On October 20, 2003, the reservation government announced an agreement between the reservation and California Governor Gray Davis to allow the operation of a casino west of Needles, California (directly across the Colorado River from the Tribe's Arizona Reservation Lands).

Language revitalization
As of 2012, The Center for Indian Education at Arizona State University "has facilitated "workshops for both learners and speakers at the Fort Mojave Indian Reservation in northwest Arizona, California and Nevada. Fort Mojave has about 22 elders who speak some Mojave." The project is also bringing elders together with younger people to teach the traditional Mojave "bird songs."

The language preservation work of poet Natalie Diaz on the reservation was featured on the PBS NewsHour in March 2012.

Location

Education
The portion of the reservation in California is served by the Needles Unified School District and the portion in Nevada by the Clark County School District.  For elementary education in Arizona, one of the portions served by the Bullhead City Elementary School District and the other by the Mohave Valley Elementary School District.  Both portions in Arizona are served by the Colorado River Union High School District for secondary education.

Communities
 Arizona Village, Arizona (part)
 Fort Mohave, Arizona (part)
 Golden Shores, Arizona (part)
 Mesquite Creek, Arizona
 Mohave Valley, Arizona (part, population 121)
 Mojave Ranch Estates, Arizona
 Needles, California (part, population 208; seat of tribal government)
 Willow Valley, Arizona (part)

References

External links
 Official Tribe Website
 Fort Mojave Reservation, Northern Arizona University
 Fort Mojave Tribe, InterTribal Council of Arizona

American Indian reservations in Arizona
American Indian reservations in California
American Indian reservations in Nevada
Populated places in Clark County, Nevada
Populated places in Mohave County, Arizona
 
Federally recognized tribes in the United States
Communities in the Lower Colorado River Valley
Colorado River tribes
Populated places in San Bernardino County, California
Arizona populated places on the Colorado River
California populated places on the Colorado River